The 2016 Greek Basket League Playoffs included the top eight place finishing teams of the 2015–16 Greek Basket League regular season.

Bracket

Teams in bold won the playoff series. Numbers to the left of each team indicate the team's original playoff seeding. Numbers to the right indicate the score of each playoff game.

Quarter-finals
In the quarterfinals, teams playing against each other had to win two games to win the series. Thus, if one team wins two games before all three games have been played, the games that remain are omitted. The team that finished in the higher regular season place, played the first and the third (if it was necessary) games of the series at home.

Game 1

Game 2

Game 3

Semi-finals
In the semi-finals, teams playing against each other had to win three games to win the series. Thus, if one team won three games before all five games had been played, the games that remained were omitted. The team that finished in the higher regular season place played the first, the second, and the fifth (if it was necessary) games of the series at home.

Game 1

Game 2

Game 3

Game 4

Game 5

Third place
In the series for the third place, teams playing against each other had to win three games to win the 3rd place in the final rankings of the season. Thus, if one team won three games before all five games had been played, the remaining games were omitted. The team that finished in the higher regular season place, played the first, the third, and the fifth (if it was necessary) games of the series at home.

Game 1

Game 2

Game 3

Game 4

Finals
In the finals, teams playing against each other had to win three games to win the title. Thus, if one team won three games before all five games were played, the remaining games were omitted. The team that finished in the higher regular season place, played the first, the third, and the fifth (if it was necessary) games of the series at home.

Game 1

Game 2

Game 3

Game 4

External links
 Official Basket League Site 
 Official Basket League Site 

2015–16 in Greek basketball